Milan Ilić (born 12 May 1987) is a Serbian footballer, who plays as a centre back.

Honours
Radnički Kragujevac
Serbian League West: 2016–17

References

External links
 
 
 

1987 births
Living people
Sportspeople from Kragujevac
Association football defenders
Serbian footballers
Serbian expatriate footballers
FK Radnički 1923 players
OFK Beograd players
FK Dinamo Vranje players
FK Javor Ivanjica players
FK Radnički Obrenovac players
FK Inđija players
FK Čelik Nikšić players
NK Krško players
C.D. Santa Clara players
FC Metalurh Zaporizhzhia players
FK Zlatibor Čajetina players
FK Kolubara players
Serbian First League players
Serbian SuperLiga players
Montenegrin First League players
Liga Portugal 2 players
Ukrainian Premier League players
Slovenian PrvaLiga players
Serbian expatriate sportspeople in Portugal
Expatriate footballers in Portugal
Serbian expatriate sportspeople in Ukraine
Expatriate footballers in Ukraine
Serbian expatriate sportspeople in Montenegro
Expatriate footballers in Montenegro
Serbian expatriate sportspeople in Slovenia
Expatriate footballers in Slovenia